Colorado's 34th Senate district is one of 35 districts in the Colorado Senate. It has been represented by Democrat Julie Gonzales since 2019, succeeding fellow Democrat Lucía Guzmán.

Geography
District 34 covers western and northwestern Denver.

The district is located entirely within Colorado's 1st congressional district, and overlaps with the 1st, 2nd, 4th, 5th, and 8th districts of the Colorado House of Representatives.

Recent election results
Colorado state senators are elected to staggered four-year terms; under normal circumstances, the 34th district holds elections in midterm years. The 2022 election will be the first held under the state's new district lines.

2022

Historical election results

2018

2014

Federal and statewide results in District 34

References 

34
Government of Denver